Andreas Bouchalakis (born 5 April 1993) is a Greek professional footballer who plays as a central midfielder for Süper Lig club Konyaspor, on loan from Olympiacos, and the Greece national team.

Club career

Ergotelis
Bouchalakis started his football career attending the Ergotelis Academy, the youth system of his local Superleague club Ergotelis. His performances with the club's youth teams in the Greek Superleague Youth Leagues led the club's board of directors to promote him to the first team on 19 May 2011, when he signed his first professional contract with the club at the age of 18. He eventually made his debut on 11 December 2011, in a game against Doxa Drama.

During the summer of 2012, Bouchalakis earned the trust of manager Siniša Gogić and became a regular starter for the club during their short tenure in the Greek Football League. His good performances reportedly drew the attention of many clubs, both in Greece and abroad. Eventually, Greek giants Olympiacos acquired his rights from Ergotelis on 22 March 2013 for a reported €150K, following up on the acquisition of Bouchalakis' fellow Ergotelis teammate Manolis Tzanakakis. As part of the deal, both players were allowed to finish the season with Ergotelis, who also acquired the right re-sign both players on loan in the following season. Bouchalakis was instrumental in helping the club return to the Superleague at the end of the 2012–13 season, summing up 40 caps in both the Football League and Greek Cup competitions and managing to score 6 goals while dishing out two assists.

After Bouchalakis' and Tzanakakis' transfers were announced by Olympiacos, the club's board of directors decided to green-light the loan deal with Ergotelis, who added both players to their roster for the 2013–14 Superleague season in order for them to receive substantial playing time in top-flight in a familiar environment. Bouchalakis contributed to Ergotelis' all-time best (at the time) 7th-place finish with 30 caps and 2 goals. He returned to Olympiacos in the summer of 2014 to earn a spot in the champions' roster for next season.

Olympiacos
Bouchalakis scored from long distance in a 3–0 win against Milan in the 2014 International Champions Cup.

On the beginning of the 2015–16 season, Bouchalakis tried his best to convince his coach Marco Silva to stay in the club. His contract was extended in 2016 until the summer of 2020.

Nottingham Forest
After a trial in pre-season, Bouchalakis signed a 3-year contract with EFL Championship club Nottingham Forest in July 2017. As Forest and Olympiacos had the same owner, there was no transfer fee. He scored twice on his league debut as Forest won 4–3 away to Brentford on 12 August. He played regularly in the first half of the season but lost his place under new manager Aitor Karanka.

Return to Olympiacos
Bouchalakis rejoined Olympiacos in July 2018. On 23 August 2018, he scored with a header from Kostas Fortounis' free kick to help Olympiacos beat Burnley 3–1 at home in the first leg of the 2018–19 Europa League play-off round; it was his first goal in UEFA competitions. On 31 March 2019, he scored his first goal of the 2018–19 Super League season to beat Atromitos 2–1. On 1 March 2020, Bouchalakis latched on to the second Mathieu Valbuena's assist in the game, to score a second for Olympiacos in a 2–0 home game against Panetolikos, head into the 2019–20 playoffs with an undefeated 26 matches' record. It was his first goal for the season.

Career statistics

Club

International

Scores and results list Greece's goal tally first, score column indicates score after each Giakoumakis goal.

Honours

Club
Olympiacos
Super League Greece: 2014–15, 2015–16, 2016–17, 2019–20, 2020–21, 2021–22
Greek Cup: 2014–15, 2019–20; runner-up: 2015–16, 2020–21

International
Greece U19
UEFA European Under-19 Championship runner-up: 2012

Individual
Football League Greece Young Footballer of the Year: 2012–13
Super League Greece Team of the Year: 2020–21

References

External links
 
 
 

1993 births
Living people
Greece youth international footballers
Greece under-21 international footballers
Greece international footballers
Ergotelis F.C. players
Olympiacos F.C. players
Nottingham Forest F.C. players
Konyaspor footballers
Super League Greece players
Football League (Greece) players
Footballers from Heraklion
Greek footballers
Association football midfielders